The Cultural and Scientific Center "Milutin Milanković" is a public cultural and educational institution in Dalj in eastern Croatia. The Center promotes the legacy of Milutin Milanković, Serbian mathematician, astronomer, climatologist, geophysicist, civil engineer and popularizer of science. It also organizes cultural events and exhibitions, issue publications, audiovisual and promotional materials, preserve traditional heritage, organize cultural and scientific meetings, promote sustainable development and popularize science. In 2012 the Center was visited by more than 5,000 visitors.

The Center is located in the birth house of Milutin Milanković. After the end of the Croatian War of Independence and the end of United Nations Transitional Administration for Eastern Slavonia, Baranja and Western Sirmium mission house remained in deteriorating conditions up until the 2006. At that time Municipality initiated establishment of the center which will serve as the meeting point for students coming from both banks of Danude River (both Croatia and Serbia).

Building
Alongside Center's main building other venues are occasionally used to host a variety of events. The 131'st anniversary of Milutin Milanković's birth was marked in May 2010 with a series of activities. In 2011 the Center participated in the cross-border cooperation project "From people to people" with participants including the Municipality of Erdut, the City Library of Sombor, the Cultural Center "Laza Kostić" Sombor, and the Provincial Secretariat for International Cooperation of Vojvodina. Project was financed from the European Union funds.

According to Center's Statute, along with Croatian, Serbian language and Serbian cyrillic alphabet is used officially as well.

See also
 Milutin Milanković
 Dalj High School

References

Education in Croatia
Milanković
Research institutes established in 2009
Organizations established in 2009
Serbian minority institutions and organizations in Croatia
Joint Council of Municipalities
Buildings and structures in Osijek-Baranja County
Multidisciplinary research institutes
Birthplaces of individual people
Tourist attractions in Osijek-Baranja County